The Changpa or Champa are a semi-nomadic Tibetan people found mainly in the Changtang in Ladakh, India. A smaller number resides in the western regions of the Tibet Autonomous Region and were partially relocated for the establishment of the Changtang Nature Reserve. As of 1989 there were half a million nomads living in the Changtang area.

Changpa of the Tibet Autonomous Region 
The homeland of the Changpa is a high altitude plateau known as the Changtang, which forms a portion of western and northern Tibet extending into southeastern Ladakh, and Changpa means "northerners" in Tibetan. Unlike many other nomadic groups in Tibet, the Changpa are not under pressure from settled farmers as the vast majority of land they inhabit is too inhospitable for farming.

Most of the Tibetan Changtang is now protected nature reserves consisting of the Changtang Nature Reserve, the second-largest nature reserve in the world, and four new adjoining smaller reserves totalling 496,000 km2 (191,507 sq. miles) of connected Nature Reserves, which represents an area almost as large as Spain, and bigger than 197 countries. Since the reserves have been established there has been a welcome increase in the numbers of endangered species. The protected areas stretch across parts of the Tibet Autonomous Region, Xinjiang and Qinghai in China.

Changpa of Ladakh 
The Changpa of Ladakh are high altitude pastoralists, raising mainly yaks and goats. Among the Ladakh Changpa, those who are still nomadic are known as Phalpa, and they take their herds from in the Hanley Valley to the village of Lato. Hanley is home to six isolated settlements, where the sedentary Changpa, the Fangpa reside. Despite their different lifestyles, both these groups intermarry. The Changpa speak Changskhat, a dialect of Tibetan, and practice Tibetan Buddhism.

Only a small part of Changthang crosses the border into Ladakh, in the Indian union territory of Jammu and Kashmir. It is, however, on a historically important route for travelers journeying from Ladakh to Lhasa, and now has many different characteristics due to being part of India. Historically, the Changpa of the Ladakh would migrate with their herds into Tibet, but with Chinese takeover of Tibet, this route has been closed.

, the Changpa were classified as a Scheduled Tribe under the Indian government's reservation program of affirmative action.

Changpas and Their Goats
For many Changpas, rearing of animals, and consuming and selling their produce (milk and its products, hair and meat) is the only means of livelihood. 

The Changpas rear the highly pedigreed and prized Changra goats (Capra Hircus) that yield the rare Pashmina (Cashmere) fibre. The Changra goats are not raised for their meat but for their fibre (pashm). The pashmina fibre (Pashm in Persian) is the finest fibre of all goat hair.

Documentary
A documentary Riding Solo to the Top of the World was made by Gaurav Jani. Another documentary "The Nomadic Night" depicting the life of Changpas was made by Marianne Chaud.

References 

Ladakh
Social groups of Jammu and Kashmir
Ethnic groups in China
Tibetan people
Modern nomads
Pastoralists
Scheduled Tribes of Jammu and Kashmir
Scheduled Tribes of India